The Uruguayan Championship 1917 was the 17th season of Uruguay's top-flight football league.

Overview
The tournament consisted of a two-wheel championship of all against all. It involved ten teams, and the champion was Nacional. This was the third consecutive title for Nacional, so they would get their first Cup. It was also the second tournament they won undefeated.

Teams

League standings

References
Uruguay - List of final tables (RSSSF)

Uruguayan Primera División seasons
Uru
1